Charles Bruce Green (born June 1, 1955) is a retired lieutenant general in the United States Air Force and was the twentieth Surgeon General of the United States Air Force.

Career
Green joined the Air Force in 1978. He was first assigned to Eglin Air Force Base. Later, he was assigned to Mather Air Force Base, Wheeler Air Force Base, Hickam Air Force Base, Brooks City-Base, and Clark Air Base. In 1990, Green assisted in humanitarian efforts in the Philippines after a major earthquake struck Baguio and also during Operation Fiery Vigil. He was named Command Surgeon of the United States Central Command in 1997, North American Aerospace Defense Command in 1999, and the United States Transportation Command and Air Mobility Command in 2001. Later, he was given command of the 59th Medical Wing. He was named Assistant Surgeon General for Health Care Operations in 2005 before becoming Deputy Surgeon General in 2006. Green was named Surgeon General in 2009.

Awards he has received include the Air Force Distinguished Service Medal with oak leaf cluster, the Defense Superior Service Medal with oak leaf cluster, the Legion of Merit, the Defense Meritorious Service Medal, the Airman's Medal, the Meritorious Service Medal with four oak leaf clusters, the Joint Service Commendation Medal, the Air Force Commendation Medal with two oak leaf clusters, the Air Force Achievement Medal, the National Defense Service Medal with service star, the Armed Forces Expeditionary Medal, and the Humanitarian Service Medal with service star.

Education
B.S., Chemistry – University of Wisconsin-Parkside
M.D. – Medical College of Wisconsin
Graduate – Air Command and Staff College
M.P.H. – Harvard University
Graduate – Air War College

References

Surgeons General of the United States Air Force
Recipients of the Air Force Distinguished Service Medal
Recipients of the Legion of Merit
Recipients of the Airman's Medal
University of Wisconsin–Parkside alumni
Harvard School of Public Health alumni
Living people
Recipients of the Defense Superior Service Medal
Medical College of Wisconsin alumni
1955 births